The San Blas coral-brotula (Pseudogilbia sanblasensis) is a species of viviparous brotula found in reefs along the Caribbean coast of Panama.  This species grows to a length of  SL.  This species is the only known member of its genus.

References

Bythitidae
Monotypic fish genera
Fish described in 2004